Avguštine (in older sources also Avgustine) is a settlement in the Municipality of Kostanjevica na Krki in eastern Slovenia. The area is part of the traditional region of Lower Carniola. It is now included in the Lower Sava Statistical Region.

There is a small chapel-shrine in the settlement. It was built in the early 20th century.

References

External links
Avguštine on Geopedia

Populated places in the Municipality of Kostanjevica na Krki